Christ Church is a church in Walshaw, Greater Manchester, England, and is a Grade II* listed building.  Designed in the Gothic Revival style by Lawrence Booth in 1888, the building was funded by Rev John Gorrell Haworth and Miss Nancy Haworth, and took four years to complete. It was erected as a memorial to Manchester cotton and fustian manufacturer Jesse Haworth, as noted prominently across the west facade of the building.

The church is large, with an especially wide nave and has an "admirable" steeple at its southeast corner, visible from the town of Bury in the valley below. The nave is crossed by two broad transepts, each two bays wide. Interior columns are of granite with shaft rings and in places the arcades feature double rows of columns. The windows are in the Gothic style but, as Pevsner notes, they have "un-Gothic transoms."

Internally, the church features a fine circular font, encrusted with stiff-leaf decoration.

The churchyard contains war graves of three soldiers and two airmen of World War II.

Christ Church has connections with the local community, including the church primary school and the local day nursery, and actively supports local voluntary secular and Christian mission agencies including Porch Boxes food bank, Street Pastors, and the Message. The parish also engages in national and international ministry through its support and partnership with 'Tearfund', the 'Bible Society', 'Musalaha': ministry of reconciliation, 'Compassion' and 'The Bury Project: Christians Against Poverty'.

Rev Steven Openshaw FdA BA MSc has been Priest in Charge of the Parish of Christ Church Walshaw since February 2016.

See also

 List of churches in Greater Manchester
 Grade II* listed buildings in Greater Manchester
 Listed buildings in Tottington, Greater Manchester

References

External links
 Christ Church, Walshaw website
 A church near you: Christ Church Walshaw

Grade II* listed churches in Greater Manchester
Church of England church buildings in Greater Manchester
Churches completed in 1889
19th-century Church of England church buildings
Anglican Diocese of Manchester